Freddy Zix (born 7 January 1935) was a French footballer. He competed in the men's tournament at the 1968 Summer Olympics.

References

External links
 

1935 births
Living people
French footballers
Olympic footballers of France
Footballers at the 1968 Summer Olympics
Footballers from Strasbourg
Association football midfielders
Mediterranean Games gold medalists for France
Mediterranean Games medalists in football
Competitors at the 1967 Mediterranean Games